Masha is a Russian diminutive form of the given name Maria.

Masha may also refer to:
Masha (unit), an Indian traditional measure of weight
Masha (woreda), a woreda (administrative division) of Ethiopia
Masha (town), a town in the woreda
Masha (2004 film), a Russian comedy film
Masha (2020 film), a Russian thriller drama film
Mosha, also spelled Masha, a village in Tehran Province, Iran

See also
Mas-ha, a Palestinian village in the West Bank
 Mascia